John Smillie (born April 16, 1954) is a Scottish retired-American soccer player who played professionally in the North American Soccer League and Major Indoor Soccer League.

In 1972, Smillie began his collegiate soccer career at De Anza College before transferring to San Jose State University where he was a 1975 Second Team All American soccer player. In 1976, the Portland Timbers selected Smillie in the first round of the North American Soccer League draft. He transferred to the San Jose Earthquakes for the 1977 and 1978 seasons. In the fall of 1978, he moved indoors with the Cincinnati Kids of the Major Indoor Soccer League. He also played the 1980–1981 season with the San Francisco Fog of MISL.

References

External links
NASL/MISL stats

1954 births
Living people
Footballers from Glasgow
American soccer players
Cincinnati Kids players
Major Indoor Soccer League (1978–1992) players
Scottish emigrants to the United States
North American Soccer League (1968–1984) players
Portland Timbers (1975–1982) players
San Francisco Fog (MISL) players
San Jose Earthquakes (1974–1988) players
San Jose State Spartans men's soccer players
Scottish footballers
Scottish expatriate footballers
Association football forwards
Scottish expatriate sportspeople in the United States
Expatriate soccer players in the United States
Association football defenders